Linguistics: An Introduction to Language and Communication is a textbook by Adrian Akmajian, Ann K. Farmer, Lee S. Bickmore, Richard A. Demers and Robert M. Harnish in which the authors provide an introduction to linguistics. It is described as a well-known introductory text in linguistics.

Reception
The book has been reviewed by Sheila M. Embleton, Marcia Haag, Rose Maclaran and Chr. Maier.

References

External links 
 Linguistics: An Introduction to Language and Communication

1979 non-fiction books
Linguistics textbooks
MIT Press books